is the 32nd single released by Japanese boy band Kanjani Eight. It was released on 3 June 2015 on the band's Infinity Records label. It was number 1 on the weekly Oricon chart for the week of 1–7 June 2015. The song spent a total of 11 weeks in the Oricon chart and was the second-best selling single of June 2015 with 169,881 copies. It also reached number one on the Billboard Japan Hot 100. The song was used as the opening theme song on the Nippon Television drama series Do S Deka. The song was also included in the band's November 2015 album .

Track listing
Standard release
Tsuyoku Tsuyoku Tsuyoku
Extend!
Can't U See?

Limited release version (including DVD)
Tsuyoku Tsuyoku Tsuyoku
Extend!

References 

2015 singles
2015 songs
Japanese-language songs
Kanjani Eight songs
Oricon Weekly number-one singles
Billboard Japan Hot 100 number-one singles